Rutland Township may refer to:

 Rutland Township, Kane County, Illinois
 Rutland Township, LaSalle County, Illinois
 Rutland Township, Humboldt County, Iowa
 Rutland Township, Woodbury County, Iowa
 Rutland Township, Montgomery County, Kansas
 Rutland Township, Barry County, Michigan
 Rutland Township, Martin County, Minnesota
 Rutland Township, Sargent County, North Dakota, in Sargent County, North Dakota
 Rutland Township, Meigs County, Ohio
 Rutland Township, Tioga County, Pennsylvania
 Rutland Township, Lake County, South Dakota, in Lake County, South Dakota

Township name disambiguation pages